Strandvik is a village in the municipality of Bjørnafjorden in Vestland county, Norway.

Strandvik faces south towards the Bjørnafjorden, a main thoroughfare for shipping along the coast which lies south of the city of Bergen between the municipalities  Tysnes, Austevoll, and Bjørnafjorden. Strandvik Church is in the village together with an elementary school, kindergarten, a grocery shop, and the Handelslaget pub.

References

External links
Official homepage
Strandvik Church
Bjørnafjorden

Villages in Vestland
Bjørnafjorden